Paul-Otto Bessire (Moutier 21 April 1880 – 6 September 1958) was a Swiss historian.

He studied at the Ecole normale in Porrentruy and at the universities of Basel and Bern.

He taught high school in Moutier, and was then a professor at the Ecole cantonale in Porrentruy.

Works
Histoire du Jura bernois et de l'ancien Évêché de Bâle, Porrentruy, 1935 
Histoire du peuple suisses par le texte et par l'image, Moutier, 1940
Berne et la Suisse: Histoire de leurs relations depuis les origines jusqu'à nos jours, Berne, 1953
Le banneret: Pièce historique en 4 actes avec chants et musique, Bienne, 1927
Le cerisier en fleurs, Lausanne, 1930
La clairière enchantée: Nouvelles et légendes jurassiennes, Porrentruy, 1944
Images de la Suisse, Berne, 1936
Jacob-Henri Meister (1744-1826): Sa vie et ses œuvres, Delémont, 1912
Léon Froidevaux 1876-1931 : Le musicien et le journaliste, Moutier, 1943
Les origines de la Suisse et les communautés libres, Berne, 1938
La question jurassienne, Porrentruy, 1919
Le rôle des Suisses dans les troubles de l'Évêché de Bâle (1726-1740), Delémont, 1918
Sous le ciel natal, poèmes, Tavannes, 1933

1880 births
1958 deaths
Swiss male writers
20th-century Swiss historians
20th-century male writers